Nokia 7360 fashion cell phone was released in late 2005, as part of the "L'Amour Collection", along with the 7370, 7373, 7380 and the 7390.

Specification sheet

Images

References

7360
Mobile phones introduced in 2005
Mobile phones with user-replaceable battery